Saša Lozar (born 12 February 1980) is a Croatian singer. Lozar rose to fame in 2003 after finishing as runner-up on the first season of Story Supernova Music Talents. In late 2003, Lozar formed the boy band Saša, Tin i Kedžo together with Damir Kedžo and  Tin Samardžić. Lozar began to adopt a more mature image as an artist with the release of his debut solo album 1 Dan (2007).

Early life
Lozar was born in Laduč, in the Yugoslav republic of Croatia. He has a younger brother named Ivan. He attended the Tituš Brezovački Gymnasium and earned his high school diploma in 1998.

Music career
Lozar's first musical appearance was in 1992 when he as a contestant on Hrvatska radiotelevizija's Turbo Limach Show. He made it to the finals where he lost to Renata Sabljak thus finishing as the runner-up.

In 2003, Lozar auditioned for the first and only season of Nova TV's talent show Story Supernova Music Talents by singing "Hero" and "Kad mi dođeš ti" by Oliver Dragojević. He later advanced to the live shows. Lozar was announced as the runner-up for the first season of Story Supernova Music Talents.

A year after, in January of 2004, he became a part of the Croatian boy band "Saša, Tin i Kedžo" along with Damir Kedžo and Tin Samardžić. The band's debut album, titled Instant, sold 10,000 copies in its chart run, while their debut single "365" topped the Croatian charts for six weeks. In 2005 the band disbanded allowing Lozar and the other members to pursue solo projects.

On 29 May 2006, Lozar released his debut single "Na kraju dana". Lozar's debut album 1 dan was released on 30 June 2007 through Croatia Records.

On 7 September 2015, Lozar was announced to join the cast of the second season of television show Tvoje lice zvuči poznato (Your Face Sounds Familiar), in which celebrity contestants impersonate a different iconic music artist on stage each week. In the season finale that took place on 6 December 2015, he was declared winner.

He voiced Branch in the Croatian-language version of the commercially successful animated motion picture Trolls (2016).

Personal life
On 27 August 2005 Lozar married his long-time girlfriend Marija Bajs. In 2009 he announced via social media that Marija had given birth to their daughter, Eva.

Discography

Studio albums
 1 dan (2007)

Singles

References

External links

21st-century Croatian male singers
Living people
1980 births
People from Zagreb County
Croatian pop singers
Your Face Sounds Familiar winners